A Little More Love may refer to:

 "A Little More Love" (Jerrod Niemann and Lee Brice song), 2016 
 "A Little More Love" (Lisa Stansfield song), 1992
 "A Little More Love" (Olivia Newton-John song), 1978
 "A Little More Love" (Vince Gill song), 1997

See also
 "Little More Love", a 2021 song by AJ Tracey from the album Flu Game